The following is a list of characters from Big Nate, an American comic strip and book series written and illustrated by Lincoln Peirce.

Nate Wright
The comic strip's main character, Nate Wright is an eleven-year-old in sixth grade. He is a talented cartoonist, drummer, and chess player. He is also a natural prankster, as he successfully pulls funny and difficult pranks, mostly on "Prank Day" which occurs on the last or second-to-last day of school. He is somewhat vain, believing himself to be irresistible to girls despite being rejected repeatedly by his crush, Jenny Jenkins, however in some books he does get a girlfriend.

He believes he is a brilliant sports player despite his lack of athletic abilities. He also thinks of himself as a genius despite his below-average grades. Nate spends much of his time in the detention room (due to receiving many detentions), in the art room drawing comics, or playing drums for his band Enslave the Mollusk, which also comprises his friends Francis Pope, Teddy Ortiz, and Artur Pashkov. Nate is desperate to own a dog, much to the disgust of his sister Ellen and the disapproval of his father Martin. He also has ailurophobia, the fear of cats, hates figure skating, and is disgusted by egg salad, but loves Cheez Doodles (named "Cheesy Snacks" in the TV series).

Nate is also well known as being able to detect 'vibes' and once said that he could tell when something is ‘trending’. He even tried to teach his friend Chad Applewhite this ability but failed. Nate is also known for having an extremely accurate sense of smell and can sniff out any food, except for school lunches. Nate has stated before that he is a Scorpio. He dubbed himself "The Nickname Czar" because he is good at coming up with nicknames, which he does a lot, mainly to Mrs. Godfrey. His spiky hair has been described by the other characters as being weird, and when he tried to flatten it down with hair gel, it went back to normal quickly.

In the TV series, he is voiced by Ben Giroux.

Nate's comic strip creations
Some earlier strips would show the weekly adventures of Nate's own comic strip creations, drawn on notebook paper in a more childlike drawing style.
 Dr. Cesspool (voice by Ben Giroux) - An inept surgeon whose mistakes in the operating room tend to be either fatal or debilitating. He has an assistant named Maureen Biology, who also serves as Cesspool's love interest. He also has a rival doctor named Dr. Arch-enemy. In early strips, he was a psychopathic serial killer as well as a doctor.
 Chip Chipson and Biff Biffwell - Two inept TV reporters who sometimes appear in other strips interviewing the characters. Nate also has them interview characters like Santa Claus, Mother Nature, the Sandman and sometimes Mrs. Godfrey or his own father.
 Ken Doolittle - A talent TV show host. Ellen is often drawn on his show failing at some activity or making a fool of herself.
 Dan Cupid - A cupid who sometimes neglects or messes up his job to bring happy couples together.
 Stan Cupid - The evil younger brother of Dan who breaks up couples.
 Superdad - Nate's parody of his own father as 'The world's only bald superhero with a slight paunch,' who sometimes appears with Ellen as his 'dimwitted sidekick', "Mega-Teen" (a parody of Ellen). Superdad usually avoids fighting crime or facing danger, preferring to lie on the couch or delegate his job to 'Chore Boy (Nate himself).
  The Snuggles Family - A parody of a saccharine, wholesome middle-class family, consisting of husband Bob, wife Honey, son Timmy, daughter Punkin, and dog Fluffy, a grandpa, and a ghost of a grandma and grandpa. This family hasn't been seen since 2015.
 Moe Mentum - A Hollywood stuntman stuck doing dangerous stunts in badly directed action or horror flicks.
 Slim Stubby - A country-western singer struggling with being a second-rate celebrity, who is a possible parody of Slim Dusty.
 The Pilgrims of Plymouth - These strips would appear the week of Thanksgiving. Instead of showing the traditional 'First Thanksgiving,' the strip would show the Pilgrims having a wild party, complete with dunk tanks and bikini mud-wrestling. Haven't been seen since 2015.
 Leo Tard - Dance Instructor for the totally hopeless. Series of strips mocking Nate's sister Ellen's dancing abilities.
 Ultra-Nate - Nate's parody of himself, but a superhero with super strength, flying, and super suction who "gets the girls" and is muscular.
 Mega-Chad - Appears in Big Nate in the Zone and Big Nate Lives it Up as Ultra Nate's sidekick. Mega-Chad was in the comic strip only for a May 2016 arc where Nate and Teddy make their own superhero film starring Chad.
 Captain Frantastic and Teddy Titan - Sidekicks for Ultra-Nate as seen in "Big Nate Lives it Up". They were never featured in a strip, and were only seen once.
 Action Cat - A comic about a cat getting run over by vehicles. There were a few Action Cat comics in 1993, but there have not been any of them ever since, probably due to some complaints about those strips being too violent.
 Luke Warm, Private Eye - Nate's comic strip about a detective he made up. Luke is clumsy and inefficient. His comic first appeared in Big Nate: Flips Out. The comic was later destroyed because when Nate was hypnotized he could not make it neat enough.
 Everlovin Ellen - An early comic about Ellen's life as a comedic, exaggerated soap opera.
 Claude The Stupid Ideas Fairy - Nate's comic character that appeared in multiple books including Big Nate: In The Zone. He is depicted as a small fairy that gives bad advice to others.
 Kit and Kaboodle - A comic strip in which Kit and his sidekick Kaboodle fight crime. They are a parody of Batman and Robin.
 Man-Child - A recent comic about Nate's view of his Uncle Ted, depicting the latter as a lazy "superhero" whose only power is "getting out of work".
 Maureen Biology - Dr. Cesspool's nurse.
 Dr. Arch-enemy - Dr. Cesspool's enemy.
 Dr. Warren Fuzzy - A psychiatric doctor whom Chip Chipson and Biff Biffwell commonly interview.
 Percy the Pumpkin - A pumpkin that appeared in a Sunday comic in October 2014, who was being interviewed by Dr. Warren Fuzzy about his anxiety about being carved with a knife.
 Claire Voyant - Celebrity psychic who can predict the future and detect auras. She appeared in four comics from June 1997. She has a crystal pendant that turns black with bad luck approaches, the "bad luck" being Mrs. Godfrey telling Nate to deliver a letter to Martin, beginning the summer school/Angie storyline.

Nate's family

Marty Wright
Martin Earl "Marty" Wright is Nate's father, a bald-headed, overweight divorcée who lost his job in the eighth novel of the series (eventually getting another one). Like his son, he is somewhat clueless about his failings and considers himself a professional musician despite his indescribably horrible singing voice and initially poor steel-string guitar playing, an athlete despite his inherent laziness, and an expert golfer, though he constantly cheats or loses his ball. He is a health nut and always tries to hand out healthy alternatives to candy on Halloween (raisins, prunes, trail mix, etc.), which are always rejected by trick-or-treaters. He also was the hero of the first Mud Bowl, according to Big Nate: Blasts Off. His first name was stated on July 28, 2005.

In the TV series, he is voiced by Rob Delaney.

Ellen Wright
Ellen Wright is Nate's fifteen-year-old sister. Unlike Nate, Ellen is responsible and hardworking (though her original characterization in the earlier years of the comic strip was that of a rebellious and ditzy teenage girl) and loves cats and figure skating. Nate is always compared to Ellen in school by teachers. She is Nate's consistent rival, and he enjoys playing pranks on her. Ellen also dates Gordie on and off, who works at the comic book store, Klassic Komix, and has previously dated Kenny Smithson, the captain of the football team and is considered her crush. They briefly broke up before reconciling. She is 4 years older than Nate.

In the TV series, she is voiced by Dove Cameron.

Marge Wright
Marjorie "Marge" Wright is Nate's paternal grandmother. She and her husband, Vern, have a slightly tense relationship, as she sometimes nags him about giving up her career for married life and for generally being lazy.

Vern Wright
Vernon "Vern" Wright is Nate's paternal grandfather. He enjoys stating his opinion without consideration, using his age to show off. He is shown to have a tattoo, and he also likes Junior Mints.

Ted Wright
Nate's lazy uncle, an overweight, unemployed man-child who lives in Nate's grandparent's basement. He dropped out of college and since then has never held down a job. When he was in 5th grade, he played the oboe. He is oblivious to his family's hints that he move out and find work, and spouts sci-fi and musical trivia at the drop of a hat. He is a big fan of World of Warcraft, My Little Pony, Star Trek, and Battlestar Galactica. He is Marty Wright's brother.

Nate's friend group

Francis Pope
Francis Butthurst Pope is Nate's number #1 friend. Francis' high intelligence annoys his friends from time to time. He has a gap between his teeth and lets people bully him often. Nate and Francis frequently make fun of each other, but he states that this is how they operate. He also likes to read ‘The Book of Facts’ as he loves trivia, but his habit of reading it out loud non-stop annoys Nate and Teddy to no end. Nate and Francis often argue about cats vs dogs as Francis is a cat person, he also has a cat named Pickles. Contrary to Nate's feelings for them, Francis is friendly with both Mrs. Godfrey and Artur. Francis plays the electric guitar in Enslave the Mollusk and dates Sheila Stapleton. In Big Nate: Flips Out, it is revealed that he told Nate his embarrassing middle name (Butthurst) as a part of making their friendship official.

In the TV series, he is voiced by Daniel Cohen.

Teddy Ortiz
Teddy √ Ortiz is Nate's number "1A" best friend, Teddy is a comedic character who frequently cracks jokes and annoys Nate. Like Francis, Teddy likes Artur and is a member of Enslave the Mollusk. His middle name is the square root symbol since his parents are math teachers. He also has a mischievous little brother. In Big Nate: Flips Out, it is revealed that he is fluent in Spanish. He plays the musical keyboard in Enslave The Mollusk. In his debut year 1994, it is revealed that Teddy is half Mexican, and a half Puerto Rican, and that over the summer Teddy gets to live in Mexico with his grandparents, however, this stopped happening in 1996. Teddy also knows a lot about the Civil War, as his dad is an expert of the Civil War, and has been teaching him facts since he was a baby.

In the TV series, he is voiced by Arnie Pantoja.

Chad Applewhite
Chad is one of Nate's good friends. He is a chubby kid with red hair and freckles. He is obsessed with eating and food. Running gags include Chad suddenly appearing when someone mentions food, and the characters commenting on Chad's ability to attract girls due to his cuteness (the characters call it "the power of Chad"). He is an Aries.

In the TV series, he is voiced by Charlie Schlatter.

Dee Dee Holloway
Dee Dee Dorcas Holloway is a friend of Nate who is president of the drama club and is considered by Nate and his friends to be a drama queen. Her first appearance was in the book from the novel series, Big Nate: Strikes Again. She appeared in one of his drawings As the series went on, she gradually became a part of Nate's friend group. After the novel series ended, she became a major character in the comics.

In the TV series, she is voiced by Bryce Charles.

P.S. 38 students

Artur Pashkov
Artur is a friendly, intelligent, and well-liked exchange student from Belarus, and boyfriend of Jenny. Nate can never beat him at chess and also calls him "Mr. Perfect" or "Peachy McWonderful". Artur has a lot of major luck, and Nate believes that he is "perfect in every way". In Big Nate: On a Roll, Mr. Rosa tells Nate to hold up the ladder for Artur while he paints the scenery for the school play, only for Nate to get detention after knocking over the ladder when the paint got in his eyes.

In the TV series, Artur is voiced by Todd Haberkorn, and he is instead from a fictional nation known as Stylgravia, rather than Belarus. While Nate is generally envious of Artur, namely due to him being better than him at things such as drawing and chess and (formerly) being in a relationship with Jenny, whom Nate had a crush on for years, Artur is typically oblivious of Nate's jealousy, and even once stated that he considers Nate his best friend. Despite his jealousy of Artur, Nate does consider him a friend, stating as such as when he defends Artur from a bully from PS38 named Marcus, and he will begrudgingly admit on occasion that even he likes Artur.

Randy Betancourt
One of Nate's rivals and a school bully, although in Big Nate: Blasts Off he becomes friends with Nate and reveals himself to be insecure; as his parents are divorced, he is forced to see a counselor.

In the TV series, he is voiced by Nik Dodani.

Jenny Jenkins
Nate's classmate and biggest crush. She is Artur's girlfriend, much to Nate's annoyance. She is a Virgo, and when Nate claims that Scorpios and Virgos are compatible, Jenny notes that Artur is a Scorpio. One story arc in March/April 2016 has Nate breaking up with seventh-grader Trudy, only for Jenny to complain that he will go after her. Surprisingly, Nate actually manages to move past his crush and does not hit on her, much to her shock. Despite Jenny never actually liking Nate due to Artur being her preference for a boyfriend, Dee Dee smugly points out, "But you've always loved the fact that he liked you". In the book series, Nate ended his crush on Jenny for his new crush Ruby on "Big Nate Blasts Off".

In the TV series, Jenny is voiced by Chandhi Perekh, and Nate still has a crush on her.

Breckenridge Puffington III
Nate's most recently met student, Breckenridge is somewhat shy and enthusiastic about plants, and gardening, and he wants to be a botanist when he grows up. He was Nate's bully in kindergarten, although he does not remember bullying Nate.

Gina Hemphill-Toms
One of Nate's smartest schoolmates and his arch-rival. She has a large ego and kisses up to Mrs. Godfrey.

In the TV series, she is voiced by Lisa Kay Jennings.

Kim Cressly
A big girl who at one point decided Nate was her boyfriend and refused to take "no" for an answer. She later becomes Chester Budrick's girlfriend and uses Nate to make him feel jealous, claiming his rage is adorable.

In the TV series, she is voiced by Betsy Sodaro.

Chester Budrick
A large 7th grader whose speech and actions always occur off-panel. The reader sees only the results of Chester's actions. He is very strong and often throws people when he is mad at them, and accidentally knocks people over when he tries to high-five, fist bump, or belly bump them. Nate says he once beat up his anger management therapist. Nate also says that he is a sociopath, although this has never been confirmed.

Marcus Goode
Marcus is a "popular kid" at P.S. 38, although he tends to bully others. He is in seventh grade and his friends always follow him around. Nate calls those friends Marcettes. Recurring jokes involve Nate, Teddy, and Francis attempting to come up with comebacks to the names Marcus calls them.

Sheila Stapleton
A friend of Nate, Francis, Teddy, and Jenny. She goes out with Francis. In the older comics, it states that she is the captain of the cheerleaders and is Jenny's best friend.

Ruby Dinsmore
Nate’s crush in the eighth book, Big Nate: Blasts Off, was shown that Randy Betancourt also had feelings for her, but when Nate says he was not moving to California for his dad’s new job, she kissed him on the cheek. She also played in the Mud Bowl. Randy was always trying to impress her.

P.S. 38 staff

Clara Godfrey
The school's social studies teacher, Nate spends much of his time trying to avoid her outside of class and antagonizing her in class, making up several nicknames for her, like Venus de Silo, Godzilla, Dark Side Of The Moon, She Who Must not Be Named, Dragon Breath, etc.

Nate has been known to exaggerate her physical features in his comics. Nate has called her a 'Creature Teacher' and hates her the most due to her rude attitude towards his getting detention, and the fact that she is a cat person. Additionally, he frequently draws her as a parody of The Devil and had stated in a comic that her father is Beelzebub. Nate also thinks that 6th grade would have been much easier for him if his older sister Ellen had not been there first, as Mrs. Godfrey thought Ellen was a joy to teach, and Ellen had good grades. The relationship between Mrs. Godfrey and Nate are not entirely negative, though. She allows Nate to create reports in cartoon form, giving him an outlet for his creativity and energy. She once saved Nate from choking on a peppermint, using the Heimlich Maneuver.

She has a daughter named Katrina, and the father is unknown. Her maiden name is Lessard, and she apparently used to be "hot". She shares Nate's love for Star Trek: The Next Generation, maple donuts, and Cheez Doodles, something that is especially horrifying to him. She is also a fan of Gina and gives the class hard homework simply because Gina wants it.

In the TV series, she is voiced by Carolyn Hennesy.

Ken Rosa
Nate's art teacher, Mr. Rosa is a soft-spoken and mild-mannered man but somewhat overworked and embittered about his career. He also works at "Sweet Licks" ice cream parlor during the summer. It is also revealed that Mr. Rosa has an addiction to waffles, and sometimes gets into a "waffle coma," when he eats too many waffles.

In the TV series, he is voiced by Ryan W. Garcia.

Wesley Nichols
The principal of P.S. 38. Nate and the other students are friendly toward him, but do not treat him as an authority figure; he is bewildered by the students.

In the TV series, he is voiced by Kevin Michael Richardson.

Geraldine Shipulski
Mrs. Shipulski is Principal Nichols' secretary. She has a Twitter following that rivals most pop stars.

Mrs. Czerwicki
She is a school volunteer who supervises the students in detention. She reads romance novels while sitting in detention, and Nate occasionally goads her into complaining about her personal relationships. Mrs. Czerwicki sometimes plays table football with Nate. Nate also sometimes takes reads out of her romance novels while she is asleep.

Mr. Galvin
Mr. Galvin is Nate's aging science teacher. He has a crush on Greta Van Susteren, and has almost no visible sense of humor so conducts a boring class.

In the TV series, he is voiced by Michael Rivkin.

"School Picture Guy"
Not only appearing every year as the school picture photographer who manages to photograph Nate at his worst, but this jovial character also appears in unexpected places doing odd jobs such as a birthday clown, DJ, store Santa Claus, mall cop, a school board meeting reporter, and an advertiser for Pirates Booty mini golf. He sometimes works as a balloon blower during the summer. His real name is unknown. He wears a band-aid on his head for unknown reasons.

Coach Calhoun
Nate's main gym teacher. He is also Nate's friends' baseball, soccer, and basketball coach. He manages to keep a positive attitude despite the fact that P.S. 38's sports teams tend to lose competitions against other schools most of the time, usually by a large margin.

Coach John
A frequent substitute for Coach Calhoun, Coach John originally was the full-time coach of the school's physical education program. He also is the school's soccer(but mainly the goalie)coach. He has a sadistic approach to physical training.

In the TV series, he is voiced by Kevin Michael Richardson.

Mr. Staples
The math teacher has a tendency to tell corny knock-knock jokes and to act corny in general as well. He was born in China.

Ms. Clarke
Nate's English teacher, his second favorite teacher behind Mr. Rosa. It was mentioned that Mrs. Godfrey and Ms. Clarke are good friends.

Mrs. Hickson
Mrs. "Hickey" Hickson is The school librarian. She is a middle-aged woman who does not tolerate insolence from anyone. She is the first person to ever send Gina Hemphill-Toms to detention in Big Nate: Strikes Again.

Donna
Substitute drama teacher in the Big Nate episode "The Pimple". She is the first ever lesbian character in the entire Big Nate franchise, revealed when she introduced her wife Kathleen to Dee Dee.

She is voiced by Kimberly Brooks.

Jefferson students and teachers

Nolan
Student from Jefferson Middle school and bully to Nate and his friends.

In the TV series, he is voiced by Nik Dodani.

Zach Belfour
Striker on the Jefferson soccer team. When P.S. 38 has mold, in 2008, the P.S. 38 students move to Jefferson, Zach torments and teases Nate and his friends right up until their big soccer game. During the soccer game P.S., 38 ends Jefferson's four-year winning streak when the game goes into penalty kicks.

Mr. Chung
Nate's social studies teacher in 2008, while the P.S. 38 students go to Jefferson while the school has mold that is being cleaned up. At the start of the year, Mr. Chung seemed to have a liking for Nate, but later in the year, Mr. Chung started to yell at Nate quite a lot, possibly because Nate posts about him a lot on his blog.

Soccer Coach
Jefferson's soccer coach was tormenting Coach Calhoun before the big 2008 soccer game.

Annie
Jefferson student who beat Gina by one point on a test in 2008. They had a big argument, but then reconciled and became friends.

Sabina Shah
Sabina Shah is a girl Francis likes and tutors in the Big Nate episode "Time Disruptors". She is voiced by Chandhi Perekh.

Dina
Nolan's tall basketball enthusiast girlfriend in the Big Nate episode "Big Freeze", only seen from the neck down. She is voiced by Kimberly Brooks.

Other characters

Wink Summers
Chief Meteorologist Wink Summers is never seen, and only heard from during his show, but Nate constantly calls him and complains whenever any part of the weather is not to his liking or if Wink's forecast is wrong. Wink Summers is his nickname because his real name is Dick Schipp. He was replaced by Chip Cavendish and transferred to a weekend meteorologist in August 2011. In 2013, it has been revealed that Wink Summers came back as the chief meteorologist. His wife divorced him during the demotion and married the sports anchor.

Wink's first ever on-screen major role in the entire Big Nate franchise is in the Big Nate episode "The Future is Fuzzy".

Dot and Doug Halloway
Dot and Doug Halloway are Dee Dee's mom and dad. They've appeared in a few comics, the novel Big Nate Goes for Broke, and the Big Nate episode "Sixtween Candles".

Don Eustis
Donald "Don" Eustis is Spitsy's owner, who is depicted as a heavy man and a bachelor, and the next-door neighbor of the Wrights. Nate has an autumn job raking leaves for Mr. Eustis. He also has a summer job mowing his lawn, and a winter job shoveling snow.

Peter
Peter is a six-year-old boy who Nate sometimes babysits and serves as a 'Book Buddy.' He speaks with a lateral lisp, has an above-average IQ and reads at a college level. Nate tutors him by introducing him to Femme Fatality comics.

Miranda
Miranda is a six-year-old girl who was once babysat by Ellen Wright. She also enjoys ragging on Nate Wright. Nate once substituted Miranda's book buddy and on multiple occasions, he found Spitsy stealing Miranda's dolls because he wanted to. She occasionally works with Peter.

Gordie
Gordon "Gordie" is Ellen's boyfriend. He shares Nate's love for the comic book Femme Fatality and works at a nearby comic shop at the mall called Klassic Komix. He has a boss named Wayne, who mainly communicates by mumbling.

Angie
Nate's first girlfriend. They dated from July 1997 until February 1998 when Angie dumped Nate to go out with Dan Labreque. Unlike Nate's later girlfriends, Angie appeared in a couple more arcs, in June 1998 at a school dance and in September 1998 when she ran against Nate for class president. Angie hasn't been seen since, but she was mentioned on June 18, 2013, when Francis mentioned that Nate went out with her and Kelly.

Kelly
Nate's second girlfriend. They met at the soccer camp. She goes to Jefferson. They broke up after Nate wrote a breakup note on a detention slip in an attempt to chase after Jenny again. They dated from July 2001 to April 2002.

Trudy
A seventh grader and Nate's third girlfriend. They met at the fair when Francis and Teddy didn't want to join Nate on a rollercoaster. She went missing and Nate spent the summer trying to find her until he literally ran into her at P.S. 38. When Nate told her he is a sixth grader, he thought she did not want to go out with him, but then she kissed him, officially starting the date. However, because Nate kept going to parties and hangouts with Trudy and her friends, missing out on even more special events involving his friends, he eventually broke up with her. They dated from October 2015 to March 2016.

Daisy
A temporary girlfriend of Nate who only appeared in a long arc from February to March 2017. They broke up soon after starting to date because they felt no love while being with each other. When they kissed they felt nothing. They stayed together only for that one date.

Chip Cavendish
Chief Meteorologist Chip Cavendish was the weatherman who replaced Wink Summers as chief meteorologist when Wink was demoted. He appeared on March 5, 2012, in a science class to talk to Nate and his classmates, where Nate accused him of ruining Wink Summers' career.

Wayne
Gordie's boss at Klassic Komix, a comic shop at the mall. Wayne mainly communicates by mumbling.

Nigel
Nigel is a British doppelganger of Nate, though more snobby and having a way with girls.

Rusty Sienna
A character in the earlier years of Big Nate, host of "Oil Painting with Rusty" and Nate's inspiration to be an artist. A graduate of the Art Institute of P.O. Box 73, he is a parody of Bob Ross and his public television art show. Rusty Sienna returns to the Big Nate comic on August 2, 2007, for a strip where Nate finds out that he died on May 7, 1996, aged 56. Nate, who has been seeing episodes of him, is devastated by the fact that his favorite artist had been "secretly dead" and that he is only seeing reruns.

Cap'n Salty
A fisherman who enjoys talking like a pirate. He catches lobsters under the sea. Cap'n Salty is a character Lincoln Peirce created exclusively for the children's website Poptropica.com, where Big Nate Island is one of the features. However, the only mention of Cap'n Salty in the strip itself is the restaurant Cap'n Salty's by the beach.

Marla
Marla is the town mail deliverer.

Bradley
One of Nate's enemies. He challenged Nate to 'Gas Giant', and was apparently a video game master but his mom, who reveals his name, takes him home after he was playing Gas Giant and almost beating Nate's top score.

Kenny Smithson
Ellen Wright's former boyfriend, Kenny first appearance was in November 1991, and Ellen dumped him in June 1995. When Nate was around the mall with Francis, Nate said "I had hawk-vision eyes, and I saw Kenny Smithson with another girl!"

Carol
Carol was one of Ellen's friends.

Scoutmaster
Appeared only in Big Nate On a Roll. He announces the winners of the fundraisers and announces that the third prize goes to Josh Husky from Troop Seven. Then he announces that the two top prize winners (Nate and Artur) have a tie and to determine the winner, he flips a coin. The coin lands on heads (which Nate called) meaning that Artur won second prize and Nate won the first prize.

Pets

Spitsy
The neighborhood dog is owned by Mr. Eustis, who lives next door to Nate. Spitsy always wears a dog cone. Nate likes to hang out with Spitsy. He is "the ultimate dog nerd", for he is afraid of mailmen and he had to go to the vet and get his stomach pumped after swallowing a tennis ball. He has a crush on Francis' cat Pickles (who reciprocates his feelings), went to a cat tea party, and even knitted a sweater like his own bone once for a cat. One time Nate and Teddy caught him singing a song from the musical "Cats" on a karaoke machine. He likes figure skating as much as Ellen and gets his tongue stuck on metal poles in the winter frequently. He also gets bullied by squirrels, as shown in Big Nate: On a Roll.

In the TV series, Spitsy's vocal effects are provided by Mitch Watson.

Sherman
The gerbil in Nate's social studies class. Nate and the other students frequently confide in him or comment about his emotional state. Sherman responds to them with sarcastic comments that the students cannot hear.

Genghis
Mrs. Godfrey's blonde puppy. Appeared once when Francis and Nate were having an argument that every single dog likes Nate until Genghis nearly attacked him.

Pickles
Francis' cat, Pickles is an outdoor cat and usually hangs out on the driveway. She also has a crush on Spitsy, the neighborhood dog, much to Nate's annoyance.

Ken Rosa's Dog
Owned by Mr. Rosa but not much is known about him since no one mentions him. He is seen at Mr. Rosa's house when Nate asks Rosa for ideas for competition against Jefferson Middle School. He is a pug.

Cinnamon
Cinnamon is the cat who attacked Nate at the age of 4, giving him ailurophobia, the fear of cats.

Poco
Poco is Trudy's cat.

Ollie
Ollie is Mrs. Godfrey's cat.

Chester
Chester is Kelly's cat

Premises

Enslave the Mollusk
Enslave the Mollusk (ETM) is a garage band featured in Big Nate. It features Nate as backing vocalist and drummer, with best friends Francis on electric guitar and Teddy on keyboard, as well as Artur as lead vocalist. Chad is the band's roadie. Enslave the Mollusk had a big role in Big Nate the Musical. They performed 3 times: twice during the In The Zone novel when P.S 38 was starting a fitness zone the first time Artur wasn't there because he quit the band, but eventually rejoined by their last performance, and also at one of the school dances. They tried to perform at another school dance but failed because of a power outage. Nate was originally the lead singer as he formed the band but wasn't good enough, which was realized after Artur passed by the band playing one day. Artur then sang a rendition of "I Fought The Law" and was hired as the band's lead singer. He quit in the middle of Big Nate: In The Zone after he found a slip of paper with rude nicknames for him that Nate wrote, but was enticed back by the end of the book. The band is named "Fear the Mollusk" in the TV series.

Femme Fatality
Femme Fatality is Nate's favorite superhero comic. The images are never shown, but there were a few appearances of the eponymous character, as a life-size cardboard cut-out in a 2002 comic and as a cosplay actor visiting Klassic Komix in 2004. The character is highly suggestive, judging from the reaction of Nate and most of the other male characters (including adults). One comic claimed that she was wearing skin-tight tube top and leather mini-shorts. Some of the girls show exasperation over Nate's obsession with the comic, but Nate insists he reads it only for the stories. One of Nate's previous comic book crushes was Red Sonja. Femme Fatality later inspired Nate to create his own superhero comic called "Eve of Destruction", though he later changed the character to male, and called the comic "Steve of Destruction".

P.S. 38
P.S. 38 is the middle school that Nate and his friends attend and is where most of the comics take place. The school is noted to be over 100 years old and is considerably run down, but it was remodeled in Big Nate: Lives It Up after a painting by local folk artist Granny Peppers was found to be worth a lot of money.

Jefferson Middle School
Jefferson Middle School is a middle school near P.S. 38 and is the school's sister institution. In stark contrast to P.S. 38, Jefferson is portrayed as a large modern building with numerous 21st-century features. It has been described as "more of a museum than a school." The middle school's kids are the rivals of P.S. 38's kids and beat them in almost everything. Most Jefferson kids are always obnoxious about this. P.S. 38 beat Jefferson in the 'Ultimate Snowdown', the 1st and 38th Mud Bowl', and their big 2008 soccer game. Jefferson lost the Snowdown because they took an uncreative approach by packing snow around the spare knight statue.

References

Big Nate
Big Nate